Raphael Hadane (12 August 1923 – 8 November 2020), also known as Hadana Takoya, was the Liqa Kahenat (High priest) of Beta Israel in Israel.

Biography
He was born in Seqelt, Ethiopia and studied with the Qessim as a child. During the Italian occupation of Ethiopia, he had moved to Ambober where he worked as a farmer. He studied Hebrew briefly in 1955 when an Israeli rabbi taught in Asmara. In 1985 Qes Adana immigrated to Israel along with his wife and eleven children. 

Hadane argued for the acceptance of the Falasha Mura as Jews.  At a ceremony in 1994 marking the 10th anniversary of Operation Moses, Hadane recited the Yizkor prayer in Hebrew and Amharic in memory of 4,000 members of the community who died en route to Israel. 

Hadane died on 8 November 2020 at the age of 97.

Further reading 
Adana Takuyo, From Gondar To Jerusalem, 2011 (Hebrew)

הדנה טקויה, מגונדר לירושלים, תשע"א 2011, דפוס משכן

See also
Ethiopian Jews in Israel
Religion in Israel

References

External link
 

1923 births
2020 deaths
Kahant (Beta Israel)
Ethiopian Jews
Israeli Jews
Ethiopian emigrants to Israel